The International Exposition of 1867 was the second world's fair to be held in Paris, from 1 April to 3 November 1867. A number of nations were represented at the fair. Following a decree of Emperor Napoleon III, the exposition was prepared as early as 1864, in the midst of the renovation of Paris, marking the culmination of the Second French Empire. Visitors included Tsar Alexander II of Russia, a brother of the King William and Otto von Bismarck of Prussia, Prince Metternich and Franz Josef of Austria, Ottoman Sultan Abdülaziz, and the Khedive of Egypt Isma'il.

Conception

In 1864, Napoleon III issued a decree stating that an international exposition should be held in Paris in 1867. A commission was appointed with Prince Jerome Napoleon as president, under whose direction the preliminary work began. In addition to the main building, there were nearly 100 smaller buildings on the grounds. Victor Hugo, Alexandre Dumas, Ernest Renan, and Theophile Gautier all wrote publications to promote the event.

Exhibits

There were 50,226 exhibitors, of whom 15,055 were from France and her colonies, 6176 from Great Britain and Ireland, 703 from the United States and a small contingent from Canada. The funds for the construction and maintenance of the exposition consisted of grants of $1,165,020 from the French government, a like amount from the city of Paris, and about $2,000,000 from public subscription, making a total of $5,883,400; while the receipts were estimated to have been but $2,822,900, thus leaving a deficit, which, however, was offset by the subscriptions from the government and the city of Paris, so that the final report was made to show a gain.

Bateaux Mouches, boats capable of carrying 150 passengers, entered service conveying visitors along the Seine to and from the exhibition. There was also a new railway line built to convey passengers around the outer edge of Paris to the Champ de Mars. Two double-decker hot air balloons, the Géant and the Céleste, were moored to the site and manned by the famous photographer Nadar. Nadar would take groups of 12 or more people for flights above the grounds, where they could enjoy views of the site and Paris.

In the "gallery of Labour History" Jacques Boucher de Perthes, exposes one of the first prehistoric tools whose authenticity has been recognized with the accuracy of these theories. Napoléon III was particularly interested in exhibiting prototypes, designs, and models of workers' housing in the section of the exposition dedicated to workers' living conditions. He commissioned the architect Eugène Lacroix to design and build a set of four buildings on the rue de Monttessuy, at the edge of the exposition grounds, to demonstrate that affordable, decent housing for the working classes could be built at a profit.

The exhibition also included two prototypes of the much acclaimed and prize-winning hydrochronometer invented in 1867 by Gian Battista Embriaco, O.P. (Ceriana 1829 - Rome 1903), professor at the College of St. Thomas in Rome.

One of the Egyptian exhibits was designed by Auguste Mariette, and featured ancient Egyptian monuments. The Suez Canal Company had an exhibit within the Egyptian exhibits, taking up two rooms at the event. Which it used to sell bonds for funding.

The German manufacturer Krupp displayed a 50-ton cannon made of steel.

Americans displayed their latest telegraph technology and both Cyrus Field and Samuel Morse provided speeches.

French explorer and early ethnobotanist Marie-Théophile Griffon du Bellay exhibited a display of dried specimens of some 450 species of useful plant, collected in the course of his recent explorations of Gabon and annotated with accounts of the uses to which they were put in their native land. Most notable among these were the powerful stimulant and hallucinogen Tabernanthe iboga, containing the alkaloid ibogaine, (currently being investigated as a cure for heroin and other addictions), the legume Griffonia simplicifolia (found, subsequently, to be rich in the serotonin precursor 5-HTP), and  Strophanthus hispidus, an effective arrow poison, due to its containing cardiac glycosides with digoxin-like effects. Griffon du Bellay was awarded two medals for his exhibit.

The exposition was formally opened on 1 April and closed on 31 October 1867, and was visited by 9,238,967 persons, including exhibitors and employees. This exposition was the greatest up to its time of all international expositions, both with respect to its extent and to the scope of its plan.

Influence

For the first time Japan presented art pieces to the world in a national pavilion, especially pieces from the Satsuma and Saga domains in Kyushu. Vincent van Gogh and other artists of the post-impressionism movement of the late 19th century were part of the European art craze inspired by the displays seen here, and wrote often of the Japanese woodcut prints "that one sees everywhere, landscapes and figures." Not only was Van Gogh a collector of the new art brought to Europe from a newly opened Japan, but many other French artists from the late 19th century were also influenced by the Japanese artistic world-view, to develop into Japonism.

The Paris street near Champs de Mars, Rue de L'Exposition was named in hommage to this 1867 universal exhibition.

Jules Verne visited the exhibition in 1867, his take on the newly publicized discovery of electricity inspiring him heavily in his writing of Twenty Thousand Leagues Under the Sea.

A famous revival of the ballet Le Corsaire was staged by the Ballet Master Joseph Mazilier in honor of the exhibition at the Théâtre Impérial de l´Opéra on 21 October 1867.

The World Rowing Championships were held on the Seine River in July and was won by the underdog Canadian team from Saint John, New Brunswick which was quickly dubbed by the media as The Paris Crew.

Gallery

See also
Rejtan (painting) (won gold medal at the exposition)

Notes

Further reading
 
 Menczer, Bela. "Exposition, 1867." History Today (July 1967), Vol. 17 Issue 7, p429-436 online.

External links

Expo 1867 Paris at the Bureau International des Expositions. Retrieved May 1, 2019.
 1867 Paris (BIE World Expo) - approximately 90 links
 1867 Paris Exposition souvenir fan in the Staten Island Historical Society Online Collections Database
Ducuing, François, Vol 1: L'Exposition universelle de 1867 illustrée: publication internationale autorisée par la Commission impériale.  (Paris: Bureaux d'Abonnements, 1867).
Ducuing, François, Vol 2: L'Exposition universelle de 1867 illustrée: publication internationale autorisée par la Commission impériale.  (Paris: Bureaux d'Abonnements, 1867)
Exposition Universelle de Paris 1867 album, Getty Research Institute, Los Angeles. Accession No. 2002.R.11. The album contains 25 photographs taken by Auguste-Rosalie Bisson (Bisson Jeune) and five taken by Charles-Louis Michelez. The album documents the buildings, grounds and exhibits of the 1867 Paris Exposition universelle in Paris.

Exposition Universelle (1867)
1867 in France
1860s in Paris
Festivals established in 1867
1867 festivals